The 1985-86 Four Hills Tournament took place at the four traditional venues of Oberstdorf, Garmisch-Partenkirchen, Innsbruck and Bischofshofen, located in Germany and Austria, between 30 December 1985 and 6 January 1986.

Results

Overall

References

External links 
 Official website 

Four Hills Tournament
1985 in ski jumping
1986 in ski jumping
1985 in German sport
1986 in German sport
1986 in Austrian sport
1985 in Austrian sport